The men's double sculls competition at the 1932 Summer Olympics in Los Angeles took place are at the Long Beach Marine Stadium.

Schedule

Results

Heats
First boat of each heat qualified to the final, remainder goes to the repechage.

Heat 1

Heat 2

Repechage
First two qualify to the final.

Final

References

External links
 Official Olympic Report

Rowing at the 1932 Summer Olympics